Kochur Sotaq (also Romanized as Kochūr Sotāq, Kachūrestāq, and Kachū Rostāq) is a village in Rigestan Rural District, Zavareh District, Ardestan County, Isfahan Province, Iran. At the 2006 census, its population was 554, in 136 families.

References 

Populated places in Ardestan County